The Aral barbel (Luciobarbus brachycephalus) is a species of ray-finned fish in the genus Luciobarbus. It is found in the Aral basin, Chu drainage and southern and western Caspian Sea. For spawning, it migrates up to larger tributaries of the western and southern coasts.

References 

 

Luciobarbus
Fish described in 1872
Taxa named by Karl Kessler